Nanda Devi Glacier is a glacier in Chamoli district, Uttarakhand, India. It is near Nanda Devi.

The Nanda Devi Group of glaciers is a reference to the cluster of seven  glaciers namely Bartoli, Kururntoli, Nada Devi North, Nanda Devi South, Nandakna, Ramani and Trsul of Uttarakhand.

The glacier rose to fame, due to its breaking, which led to the 2021 Uttarakhand flood. Climate change has been suggested to have contributed to the disaster.

See also
 Mangraon
 Nanda Devi National Park
 2021 Uttarakhand flood
 Uttari Rishi Glacier

References

External links and references
 Why did the Nanda Devi glacier melt, mid-winter
 A Youtube on why the Nandi Devi glacier melted, mid-winter
 A Youtube,Could the Uttarakhand disaster have been averted?

Glaciers of Uttarakhand
Glaciers of the Himalayas